2017 State Basketball League season may refer to:

2017 MSBL season, Men's SBL season
2017 WSBL season, Women's SBL season